Frank Mense House is a historic home located at Washington, Franklin County, Missouri. It was built about 1923, and is a -story, three bay, gable front brick dwelling on a stone foundation.  It has a full-with front porch and segmental arched door and window openings.

It was listed on the National Register of Historic Places in 2000.

References

Houses on the National Register of Historic Places in Missouri
Houses completed in 1923
Buildings and structures in Franklin County, Missouri
National Register of Historic Places in Franklin County, Missouri